This is a list of football (soccer) clubs in Saint Lucia.

 1987 All Stars SCC
 Aux Lyons United (Mabouya Valley)
 B1 FC (Castries)
 BAYS FC
 Big Players FC (Marchand, Castries)
 Black Panthers SC (Soufriere)
 Ciceron Seagulls (Castries)
 Dames SC|Dames (Vieux Fort)
 Diamond Ballers FC
 Elite Challengers (Soufrière)
 El Ninos FC
 GMC United (Gros Islet)
 GSYO (Soufrière)
 Knights SC 
 Monchy United FC (Gros Islet)
 Northern United All Stars (Gros Islet)
 NYAH (Central Castries)
 New Generation FC (Babonneau)
 Pakis (Micoud)
 Pioneers F (Central Castries)
 Piton Travel Young Stars SC
 Platinum FC (Vieux Fort)
 Roots Alley Ballers (Vieux Fort)
 Roseau Valley
 Rovers United (Mabouya Valley)
 R.V. Juniors
 Ti Rocher FC
 Togetherness Youth SSC
 Uptown Rebels (Vieux Fort)
 VSADC (Central Castries)
 Lancers FC (Central Castries)
 Victory Eagles S.C.(Vieux Fort)

2022 SLFA Division One Tournament 
2022 SLFA Division Two Tournament

References

Saint Lucia
 
Football clubs
Football clubs